Erich Zander (1889–1965) was a German art director.

Selected filmography
 State Attorney Jordan (1926)
 Derby (1926)
 Students' Love (1927)
 Alpine Tragedy (1927)
 The Little Slave (1928)
 Mariett Dances Today (1928)
 Volga Volga (1928)
 Rooms to Let (1930)
 Oh Those Glorious Old Student Days (1930)
 I'll Stay with You (1931)
 Ariane (1931)
 A Thousand for One Night (1933)
 The Marathon Runner (1933)
 Spies at Work (1933)
 The Love Hotel (1933)
 The Double (1934)
 Little Dorrit (1934)
 Knockout (1935)
 The Blonde Carmen (1935)
 She and the Three (1935)
 The Young Count (1935)
 The Red Rider (1935)
 Love Can Lie (1937)
 His Best Friend (1937)
 Don't Promise Me Anything (1937)
 I Love You (1938)
 Robert and Bertram (1939)
 Quartet of Five (1949)
 The Blue Swords (1949)

References

Bibliography
 Giesen, Rolf. Nazi Propaganda Films: A History and Filmography. McFarland, 2003.

External links

1889 births
1965 deaths
German art directors
Film people from Berlin